Penmorwdd is a hamlet in the  community of Mechell, Ynys Môn, Wales, which is 142.4 miles (229.1 km) from Cardiff and 223.1 miles (359.1 km) from London.

References

See also
List of localities in Wales by population

Villages in Anglesey